Jean-Marie Toulouse,  (born 1942) is a Canadian academic.

He is a Professor and Director of the École des Hautes Études Commerciales in Montreal.

In 2004, he was made an Officer (Officier) of the National Order of Quebec. In 1997, he was made a Fellow of the Royal Society of Canada.

External links
 National Order of Quebec citation 

1942 births
Living people
Canadian business theorists
Fellows of the Royal Society of Canada
Officers of the National Order of Quebec
Members of the Order of Canada
People from Mount Royal, Quebec